Bailiff usually refers to law enforcement officers involved with lower courts of the UK or providing courtroom security and order in the US.

Bailiff may also refer to:

 Bailiff (France), a medieval governor in areas of northern France
 Bailiff (chivalric orders), a knight Hospitaller who directed one of its bailiwicks abroad or one of the national associations ("tongues") at its headquarters
 Steward (office), a general manager of medieval estates
 Landvogt, a German office
 High Bailiff of the Isle of Man
 Bailiffs of Jersey and Guernsey, the chief justice and head of the legislature of the bailiwicks of the Channel Islands
 Huissier de justice, an office in various European countries
 The Bailiffs, 1932 British comedy film with Flanagan and Allen

See also
 Baillif, Guadeloupe, France